Monaco chose its entry for the Eurovision Song Contest 2006 in an internal selection by national broadcaster, Télé Monte Carlo. Séverine Ferrer was chosen to represent the principality with the song "La Coco-Dance", written and composed by J. Woodfeel and Iren Bo and choreographed by Bruno Vandelli.

, this was Monaco's last entry in the contest, before the country withdrew the following year. The absence has continued in every edition since.

Before Eurovision

Internal selection 
TMC announced in December 2005 that the Monégasque entry for the 2006 Eurovision Song Contest would be selected internally after the broadcaster received proposals from record companies. Performer auditions took place in Monaco and Paris in January 2006 and French Head of Delegation for the Eurovision Song Contest Bruno Berberes was also involved in the selection process.

On 2 March 2006, TMC announced that Séverine Ferrer was selected as the Monégasque entrant for the Eurovision Song Contest 2006 with the song "La Coco-Dance", which contains lyrics in French and Tahitian. The song was presented to the public on 14 March 2006 during the SR Sverige programme Diggil-ej, hosted by Kris Boswell.

At Eurovision
Because Monaco failed to qualify in 2005 Séverine was forced to compete in the Eurovision semi-final, where she performed 10th, following Cyprus and preceding Macedonia. She came 21st with 14 points, failing to qualify to the Grand Final.

Monaco withdrew from the contest after this entry, and has not returned since.

Voting

Points awarded to Monaco

Points awarded by Monaco

References

2006
Countries in the Eurovision Song Contest 2006
Eurovision